Bilateral relations exist between Australia and East Timor. Both countries are near neighbors with close political and trade ties. East Timor, the youngest and one of the poorest countries in Asia, lies about 610 kilometres northwest of the Australian city of Darwin and Australia has played a prominent role in the young republic's history.

Australia has led international support for East Timor during its first 10 years of independence, not only as the largest bilateral donor of development assistance, but also by providing a leadership role to ensure security and stability in the country.

Australia led the military force that helped stabilize the country after it gained independence from Indonesia in 1999 and has been a major source of aid since. In recent years, relations between both countries have deteriorated as a result of the Australia–East Timor spying scandal.

History 

Australian Prime Minister Gough Whitlam told Indonesia that his government would not oppose an annexation of East Timor in 1975, a decision that quickly proved controversial at home. In October 1975, Indonesian troops poured across East Timor's border with Indonesian West Timor at the town of Balibo. Among those killed by the advancing Indonesian troops were five Australia-based journalists, who came to be known as the Balibo Five. Many in Australia and elsewhere were convinced that the murder of the unarmed reporters was intentional. Australian support was criticised at times. Australia and Indonesia concluded several contracts about the boundary between Timor-Leste and Australia during occupation time, which is causing several quarrels between independent Timor-Leste and its bigger neighbour.

Timor-Leste reachieved their independence on 20 May 2002, after 24 years occupation by Indonesia and three years of UN administration. The process of Timor-Leste independence began by a referendum arranged by United Nations, Indonesia and the former colonial power Portugal to choose between autonomy within Indonesia or independence. Eventually the Timor-Leste voted overwhelmingly for independence. Australia led the INTERFET during the following 1999 East Timorese crisis to stop Indonesian militias and army attacking the East Timorese civilians, and to establish the UN administration.

Since 2002, Timor-Leste had begun as the first new sovereign nation of the 21st century. Australia's involvement with East Timor has deepened since independence, especially after the internal conflict in 2006 and the sending of Australian peacekeepers.

Embassy and consulates 
Australia's embassy in Timor-Leste is located in Dili, and Timor-Leste maintains an embassy in Canberra.

East Timor also has consulates in every state of Australia; most of these positions are filled by honorary consuls.

High-level visits 
There have been numerous high-level visits between Australia and Timor-Leste:
 December 2018 – Former Prime Minister Xanana Gusmao visited Sydney
 August 2013 – then Minister for International Development Melissa Parke visited Timor-Leste
 July 2013 – President Taur Matan Ruak visited Australia
 February 2013 – then Minister for Energy and Resources and Minister for Tourism Martin Ferguson visited Timor-Leste
 December 2012 – then Foreign Minister Bob Carr visited Timor-Leste
 May 2012 – then Governor General Ms Quentin Bryce AC CVO and then Minister for Veterans' Affairs, Warren Snowdon, visited Timor-Leste to attend Timor-Leste's 10th anniversary of independence celebrations
 February 2012 – Prime Minister Xanana Gusmão visited Australia
 July 2011 – then Foreign Minister Kevin Rudd visited Timor-Leste
 April 2011 – then Defence Minister Stephen Smith visited Timor-Leste
 December 2010 – then Minister for Home Affairs Brendan O'Connor visited Timor-Leste
 October 2010 – Minister for Immigration and Citizenship Chris Bowen visited Timor-Leste
 June 2010 – then President Ramos-Horta visited Australia accompanied by three Ministers

Military
Australian Defence Force units arrived in East Timor in 1999 to quell the rioting, disorder and low-level fighting created by the Indonesian military's scorched earth campaign as it withdrew from its former possession in 1999. Australia led the INTERFET operation in 1999, and provided substantial forces to the subsequent United Nations Transitional Administration in East Timor and its successor operations. Australia also landed combat troops in the country in 2006 to quell ethnic fighting that involved East Timorese police and soldiers. The last Australian peacekeeping forces left Timor-Leste in December 2012.

The Timor Leste Defence Force has received assistance with training, advice and other forms of support from the Australian Defence Force since 2001 as part of Australia's Defence Cooperation Program. As of 2015, 25 Australian military personnel were stationed in East Timor to deliver this assistance.

Economic and trade relations
In 2013–2014, Timor-Leste ranked as Australia's 118th largest goods trading partner, with total merchandise trade valued at $24 Million
Australia and Timor-Leste had been on an international cooperation in agriculture with Timor-Leste's largest agriculture export is Coffee. Other potential agricultural crops are vanilla, spices, candle-nut and palm oil.

Oil disputes 

Large oil and gas reserves lie in the sea between the two countries in an area known as the Timor Gap. Territorial disputes over control of this resource, which some geologists estimate could pump over $10 billion of oil and gas, have coloured diplomacy with East Timor, both when it was an Indonesian possession and since. Australia broke with many of its allies and recognised Indonesia's annexation of East Timor in 1976 in what was widely seen by analysts at the time as a quid pro quo for a treaty favourable to Australia involving oil and gas exploration in the area. Since East Timor's independence, disputes over the split Dili would receive when the resource was finally developed have been an occasional strain on otherwise close relations.

It was revealed in 2013 that the Australian Secret Intelligence Service (ASIS) planted listening devices to listen to the East Timorese government during negotiations over the Greater Sunrise oil and gas fields. In the aftermath of the Australia–East Timor spying scandal, East Timor launched a case at the Permanent Court of Arbitration in The Hague to pull out of the gas treaty it had signed with Australia accusing the latter of having its intelligence agency, the Australian Secret Intelligence Service (ASIS), bug the East Timorese cabinet room in Dili in 2004.

On 3 March 2014, in response to an East Timorese request for an indication of provisional measures, the International Court of Justice (ICJ) ordered Australia not to interfere with communications between East Timor and its legal advisors in the arbitral proceedings and related matters.

New negotiations about the maritime boundary began in 2014. Both parties signed a revised agreement in March 2018, ending the long-running dispute. In addition to demarcating maritime borders, the agreement guarantees 70-80% of revenue to East Timor and 20-30% of revenue to Australia depending on where gas is piped.

Timor Sea maritime arrangements

Currently Australia and Timor-Leste have three agreements regarding maritime arrangements with Timor Sea. The Timor Sea Treaty between The government of East Timor and the government of Australia which took place in Dili, 20 May 2001, and came into force on 2 April 2003. This treaty is for a joint exploration, development and exploitation of the petroleum resources from the Joint Petroleum Development Area (JPDA).

Treaty on a Maritime Arrangement in the Timor Sea between Australia and the democratic arrangement in the Timor Sea was signed in Sydney on 12 January 2006 and came into force on 23 February 2007. This treaty provides for an equally shared revenue derived from the production of petroleum.

International Unitization Agreement for Greater Sunrise is an agreement between Australia and the Government of Democratic Republic of Timor-Leste relating to the unitization of the sunrise troubadour fields. This agreement regarding the exploitation of the Sunrise and Troubadour petroleum and gas fields in Timor Sea that known as the Greater Sunrise.

Aid 
Australia has been the biggest development partner with Timor-Leste, where Timor-Leste is one of the poorest nations, ranking 147 out of 187 countries in the UN Human Development Index.
In the decade of 2000–2010, Australia was scheduled to have provided around A$760 million in direct aid to East Timor. In 2010, East Timor President José Ramos-Horta said that 10 years of foreign aid, including from Australia, had "had no impact on transforming the lives of the people"
In 2013–14, the estimated annual aid budget from Australia to East Timor was A$106 million.

Both countries shared the Timor-Leste – Australia Strategic Planning Agreement for Development (2011), where both countries work together, in close cooperation, to improve the lives of all citizens of Timor-Leste and in so doing strengthen the bonds between our two peoples and countries.
This agreement is based on priorities taken directly from Timor-Leste's Strategic development Plan 2012 – 2030, include on economic development, infrastructure development, social capital, and institution framework

See also
 Timor Sea Treaty
 Australia-East Timor spying scandal 
 Treaty on Certain Maritime Arrangements in the Timor Sea

References

Further reading

External links

 Peter Job: The evolving narrative of denial: the Fraser government and the Timorese genocide, 1975–1980, Critical Asian Studies, Vol. 50, 2018 Issue 3.
 East Timor
 

 
East Timor 
Bilateral relations of East Timor
Timor Sea